The following are the Hong Kong national football team results.

Results

1952–1959

1970–1989

1990–2009

2010–2019

2020-present

Unofficial matches

Competitive Record Review

FIFA World Cup record

AFC Asian Cup record

Asian Games record
Since 2002, see Hong Kong national under-23 football team

East Asian Football Championship record

Dynasty Cup
1995 Dynasty Cup

1998 Dynasty Cup

Results record 
As of 17 November 2015, after the match against China.

By competition

By manager

By venue

By opponent

References
 大港腳國際賽非官方全紀錄（updated 24-10-2009） (in Chinese)